In the area of abstract algebra known as group theory, the O'Nan group O'N or O'Nan–Sims group is a sporadic simple group of order
   2934573111931
 = 460815505920
 ≈ 5.

History
For the O'Nan group n = 2 and the extension does not split. The only other simple group with a Sylow 2-subgroup of Alperin type with n ≥ 2 is the Higman–Sims group again with n = 2, but the extension splits.

The Schur multiplier has order 3, and its outer automorphism group has order 2.  showed that O'Nan cannot be a subquotient of the monster group. Thus it is one of the 6 sporadic groups called the pariahs.

Representations 
 showed that its triple cover has two 45-dimensional representations over the field with 7 elements, exchanged by an outer automorphism.

Maximal subgroups 
 and  independently found the 13 conjugacy classes of maximal subgroups of O'Nan as follows:

 L3(7):2 (2 classes, fused by an outer automorphism)
 J1 The subgroup fixed by an outer involution in O'Nan:2.
 42.L3(4):21 The centralizer of an (inner) involution in O'Nan.
 (32:4 × A6).2
 34:21+4.D10
 L2(31) (2 classes, fused by an outer automorphism)
 43.L3(2)
 M11 (2 classes, fused by an outer automorphism)
 A7 (2 classes, fused by an outer automorphism)

O'Nan moonshine 
In 2017 John F. R. Duncan, Michael H. Mertens, and Ken Ono proved theorems that establish an analogue of monstrous moonshine for the O'Nan group. Their results "reveal a role for the O'Nan pariah group as a provider of hidden symmetry to quadratic forms and elliptic curves." The O'Nan moonshine results "also represent the intersection of moonshine theory with the Langlands program, which, since its inception in the 1960s, has become a driving force for research in number theory, geometry and mathematical physics." . 

Sources

External links
 MathWorld: O'Nan Group

Sporadic groups